Georgios Servilakis (born 18 May 1997) is a Greek professional footballer who plays as a left-back for Super League 2 club Chania.

Career
Servilakis attended Panathinaikos F.C. Academy for seven years, from 2010 to 2017. In the summer of 2017, he moved to Crete, where he played for Football League side AO Chania – Kissamikos during the 2017–18 season. The next year he dropped to the Gamma Ethniki, playing in 23 games with Episkopi and scoring one goal. In September 2019, Servilakis joined Thesprotos.

References

External links
 

1997 births
Living people
Greek footballers
Gamma Ethniki players
Football League (Greece) players
Super League Greece 2 players
Super League Greece players
AO Chania F.C. players
Thesprotos F.C. players
Ergotelis F.C. players
Ionikos F.C. players
Association football defenders
Footballers from Rethymno